The Pallas family (adj. Palladian) is a small asteroid family of B-type asteroids at very high inclinations in the intermediate asteroid belt.

The namesake of the family is 2 Pallas, an extremely large asteroid with a mean diameter of about 512 km. The remaining bodies are far smaller; the largest is 5222 Ioffe with an estimated diameter of 22 km. This, along with the preponderance of the otherwise rare B spectral type among its members, indicates that this is likely a cratering family composed of ejecta from impacts on Pallas. Another suspected Palladian is 3200 Phaethon, the parent body of the Geminid meteor shower.  The family was first noted by Kiyotsugu Hirayama in 1928.

 
From the diagram, their proper orbital elements lie in the approximate ranges

At the present epoch, the range of  osculating orbital elements of the members (by comparison to the MPCORB database ) is about

References 
 

 A. Lemaitre & A. Morbidelli, Proper elements for highly inclined asteroidal orbits, Celestial Mechanics and Dynamical Astronomy, Vol. 60, pp. 29 (1994).
 Y. Kozai Secular perturbations of asteroids and comets In: Dynamics of the solar system; Proceedings of the Symposium, Tokyo, Japan, May 23–26, 1978.  Dordrecht, D. Reidel Publishing Co., 1979, p. 231-236; Discussion, p. 236, 237.

Asteroid groups and families